The men's triple jump event at the 2023 European Athletics Indoor Championships was held on 2 March at 19:53 (qualification) and 3 March at 20:35 (final) local time.

Medalists

Records

Results

Qualification
Qualification: Qualifying performance 16.70 (Q) or at least 8 best performers (q) advance to the Final.

Final

References

2023 European Athletics Indoor Championships
Triple jump at the European Athletics Indoor Championships